Rohit Chopra (born January 30, 1982) is an American consumer advocate who is the 3rd director of the Consumer Financial Protection Bureau and previous member of the Federal Trade Commission (FTC). Prior to this, Chopra served as assistant director of the Consumer Financial Protection Bureau (CFPB), a federal agency tasked with consumer protection in the financial sector. Chopra also served within the CFPB as the agency's first Student Loan Ombudsman, an office created by the Dodd–Frank Act.

In 2017, President Donald Trump nominated Chopra to fill the open Democratic seat on the Federal Trade Commission (FTC). Chopra was unanimously confirmed by the U.S. Senate, and was sworn in on May 2, 2018. As a member of the FTC, Chopra supported agency efforts to scrutinize the practices of "Big Tech" companies such as Google and Facebook.

Considered an ally of Senator Elizabeth Warren, whom he previously served under at the CFPB, Chopra favors stronger oversight of banks and other financial institutions. In 2021, he was chosen by President Joe Biden to serve as Director of the Consumer Financial Protection Bureau. Chopra is closely associated with efforts to reform the system of student loans in the United States.

Education and early career 

Chopra was born January 30, 1982, to an Indian-American family in Plainfield, New Jersey. Chopra graduated from Harvard University in 2004, where he received his bachelor's degree (B.A.) and served as president of the student body. According to The Wall Street Journal, Chopra was known by Harvard students for his "hard-charging style" with a "reputation for being a fierce advocate not afraid to clash with faculty interests".

After graduating from Harvard, Chopra attended the Wharton School of the University of Pennsylvania, where he received a Master of Business Administration (M.B.A.) degree in 2009. Chopra was a recipient of a Fulbright Fellowship to South Korea. Before entering government, he worked at McKinsey & Company, a global management consultancy firm.

Early government career

Consumer Financial Protection Bureau (CFPB) 
In the aftermath of the 2008 financial crisis and the passage of the Dodd–Frank Wall Street Reform and Consumer Protection Act ("Dodd-Frank"), Chopra worked on the implementation team that resulted in the creation of the Consumer Financial Protection Bureau (CFPB). At the CFPB, Chopra served as the agency's Student Loan Ombudsman and as the agency's assistant director. During his tenure, the agency sued for-profit colleges Corinthian Colleges and ITT Educational Services, both of which dissolved.

Chopra is a vocal critic of the mounting levels of student loan debt in the United States. In 2012, he released analysis revealing that outstanding student debt exceeded $1 trillion. Chopra co-authored a report with Holly Petraeus that uncovered a student loan overcharging scheme impacting members of the military. Chopra explained his focus on student loan policy to the Wall Street Journal, stating:In my job, every day I get calls, emails, letters from people who are drowning in debt. I hear the panic in their voices as they worry about their financial future. They aren’t numbers on a spreadsheet. I want to help make things better for them.

Post-CFPB career 
In 2016, Chopra joined the Department of Education as a senior advisor, where he worked under Under Secretary of Education Ted Mitchell. Later in 2016, Chopra was named by Democratic presidential nominee Hillary Clinton as a member of her prepared presidential transition team, though her candidacy was ultimately unsuccessful.

Chopra later became a Senior Fellow at the Consumer Federation of America (CFA), a consumer advocacy group. In 2017, Chopra released a report showing that over 1 million Americans defaulted on a student loan in 2016.

Federal Trade Commission (FTC) 
In 2017, Chopra was recommended by Senate Minority Leader Chuck Schumer to fill the open Democratic seat on the Federal Trade Commission (FTC). Chopra was formally nominated to the position by President Donald Trump, and was unanimously confirmed by the Senate on April 26, 2018. Chopra officially took office on May 2, 2018. Upon taking office, Chopra became the second Asian-American to serve on the FTC, after Dennis Yao, who served from 1991 to 1994.

During his time on the FTC, Chopra has supported efforts to scrutinize the business practices of "Big Tech" companies such as Google and Facebook. In 2020, Chopra opposed the FTC's $170 million child privacy settlement with Google, arguing that the company was not sufficiently reprimanded for its actions. Chopra had previously opposed the agency's $5 billion settlement with Facebook following a probe of the company's data practices on similar grounds, believing it was an insufficient penalty.

Chopra has stated that the federal government should "investigate how technology platforms may be a threat to our civil rights and the goals of fairness we seek in our society." In 2020, Chopra co-authored a paper with Lina Khan, his former legal advisor, in the University of Chicago Law Review titled "The Case for 'Unfair Methods of Competition' Rulemaking".

Director of the Consumer Financial Protection Bureau (CFPB)

Nomination 
During the 2020 presidential election, Chopra was mentioned as a possible candidate for a Cabinet position in a Biden administration. Chopra was mentioned as a contender for the position of Secretary of Commerce by Politico and the New York Times, but was ultimately chosen to serve as Director of the Consumer Financial Protection Bureau (CFPB). Alvaro Bedoya, the Director of the Center on Privacy and Technology, was successfully confirmed as Chopra's replacement.

Chopra's nomination was praised by Senator Elizabeth Warren, who stated through her Twitter account that "I worked closely with Rohit [Chopra] to set up the CFPB and fight for America's students. It’s terrific that President-elect Biden picked Rohit to run the [CFPB]." Chopra was confirmed 50–48 on September 30, 2021. Vice President Kamala Harris cast a tie-breaking vote on the Senate's motion to invoke cloture on Chopra's nomination.

Tenure 
As CFPB director, Chopra serves as an ex officio member of the Federal Deposit Insurance Corporation (FDIC). Since taking office, Chopra has scrutinized Big Tech companies' expansion into the payments sector. In one of his first acts in the position, Chopra ordered a probe into Amazon, Apple, Facebook, Google, PayPal and Block, Inc.-developed platform Square.

In October 2022, Chopra announced that the agency would begin data-sharing rulemaking on Section 1033 of the Dodd–Frank Act in 2023.

References

External links

 FTC commissioner Rohit Chopra: Facebook settlement ($5B fine) doesn't fix the issue (CNBC on YouTube, Jul 24, 2019)

1982 births
American politicians of Indian descent
Biden administration personnel
People of the Consumer Financial Protection Bureau
Federal Trade Commission personnel
Harvard University alumni
Living people
McKinsey & Company people
People from Plainfield, New Jersey
Progressivism in the United Kingdom
Trump administration personnel
Wharton School of the University of Pennsylvania alumni